Unc-93 homolog A (C. elegans) is a protein that in humans is encoded by the UNC93A gene.

Unc93A is a major facilitator superfamily (MFS), and a putative solute carrier in humans. It belongs to the atypical SLCs that was recently listed. It is therefore presumed that UNC93A is a transporter protein.

UNC93A is closely related to UNC93B1 and MFSD11.

UNC93A is affected by amino acid deprivation in cell cortex cultures and starvation in in vivo samples.

It is expressed in neurons, with staining close to the plasma membrane.

Read also  for functional studies in C.elegans.

For you who are interested to read more about Unc93A in different species, see:

References

Further reading 

 

Human proteins